Meranti may refer to:
Shorea or meranti, a plant genus
 Typhoon Meranti, a 2016 super typhoon that struck Taiwan and China
 Typhoon Meranti (2004)
 Tropical Storm Meranti (2010)
 Meranti, Indonesia, a district in Asahan Regency, North Sumatra Province, Indonesia
 Meranti (state constituency)